The 2009 BWF World Championships was the 17th tournament of the World Badminton Championships. It was held at the Gachibowli Indoor Stadium in Hyderabad, Andhra Pradesh, India, from 10 to 16 August 2009. Following the results of the women's singles.

Seeds

 Zhou Mi (quarter-final)
 Wang Lin (semi-final)
 Tine Rasmussen (quarter-final)
 Wang Yihan (third round)
 Xie Xingfang (final)
 Saina Nehwal (quarter-final)
 Lu Lan (champion)
 Pi Hongyan (semi-final)
 Wang Chen (third round)
 Petya Nedelcheva (third round)
 Juliane Schenk (quarter-final)
 Hwang Hye-youn (third round)
 Yip Pui Yin (third round)
 Wong Mew Choo (second round)
 Maria Kristin Yulianti (third round)
 Judith Meulendijks (second round)

Main stage

Section 1

Section 2

Section 3

Section 4

Final stage

External links 
Results

Women's singles
BWF